Patrick Shortt (born 12 December 1967) is an Irish actor, comedian, writer and entertainer. His role in the 2007 film Garage led to him receiving the IFTA for Best Actor.

Career
Shortt toured alongside Jon Kenny as comedy duo D'Unbelievables. They released "One Hell of a Video", "D'Unbelievables", "D'Video" (a live random sketch show), "D'Telly" (featuring Shortt and Kenny playing various characters – primarily two brothers who run a shop together), "D'Mother" (in which Kenny's character oversaw the running of a public house alongside his "mother" – who was later revealed to be his father, in a role played by Shortt) and "D'collection". One character played by Shortt was Dan Clancy, known for telling "his stories". The pair were highly successful in Ireland, selling out the Vicar Street venue for 14 weeks. The duo stopped touring in 2000 after Kenny was diagnosed with Hodgkin's lymphoma.

Shortt played the role of Tom, a crazy man, in the comedy series Father Ted. His character maintained a unibrow and wore a tee shirt with the slogan "I shot JR".

In 2003, RTÉ approached Shortt to create a comedy series, Killinascully.  Shortt elaborated on his work with D'Unbelievables, again playing Dan Clancy and a number of other characters. The programme ran for five seasons, with six Christmas specials.

In 2009, Shortt created and starred in a comedy, Mattie, for RTÉ, set in a Garda Síochána station. The series was retitled and reworked in 2011. The cast included Sue Collins.

He starred in the 2007 Cannes award-winning film Garage, directed by Lenny Abrahamson. Shortt won the Best Actor award at the 2008 IFTAs for his performance in this film. In 2008, An Post issued a postage stamp featuring Pat Shortt, as Josie, in the film Garage.

In 2014 Shortt appeared in Episode 3, Season 2 of the Sky 1 programme Moone Boy. In the episode the main character Martin Moone and his friend Padraig float down the River Boyle on a raft. They land on an island in Lough Key where Shortt's character, the caretaker, entertains them and helps them to return to the mainland.

Filmography

Film

Television

See also
List of people on stamps of Ireland

References

External links
 
 
Pat Shortt in 'Musicians, Singers, Comedians, etc.' file at Limerick City Library, Ireland

1966 births
20th-century Irish comedians
21st-century Irish comedians
Living people
Irish comedy musicians
Irish male film actors
Irish impressionists (entertainers)
Irish male comedians
Irish male stage actors
Irish male television actors
Irish television producers
People from Thurles
Alumni of the Limerick School of Art and Design
Irish sketch comedians